Mbereshi Girls' School was a mission boarding school at Mbereshi. As "the earliest girls' school in Northern Rhodesia ... this school gained an international reputation."

Mbereshi Girls' Boarding School was founded by the missionary Mabel Shaw in 1915, and Shaw served as its Principal until 1940. In 1946 the school was combined with the boy's boarding school to form a new coeducational institution.

Alumni
 Betty Kaunda (1928-2012), First Lady of Zambia

References

Girls' schools in Zambia
Educational institutions established in 1915
Boarding schools in Zambia
1915 establishments in Northern Rhodesia
1946 disestablishments in Africa
Educational institutions disestablished in 1946